"Young & Crazy" is a song recorded by American country music artist Frankie Ballard. It was released in January 2015 as the third single from Ballard's second studio album, Sunshine & Whiskey. The song was written by Rhett Akins, Ashley Gorley and Shane McAnally. The song was positively received by critics, who praised the lyrics and Ballard's vocal performance.

Critical reception
Giving it an "A", Tammy Ragusa of Country Weekly wrote that "it's less in your face and more tongue-in-cheek thanks to the cleverly written lyric…'Young & Crazy' seems to have been tailor-made for Frankie who is the perfect mix of the rebel without a cause and the country boy next door."

Commercial performance
The song first appeared on the Country Airplay chart on January 24, 2015. It debuted on the Hot Country Songs at No. 50 for chart dated March 14, 2015, and Billboard Hot 100 at No. 91 on chart date June 16, 2015. It peaked on the Hot 100 at No. 55 the chart date of August 29, 2015, and on Hot Country Songs at No. 8 for the chart date of September 5, 2015. On September 5, "Young & Crazy" also reached the top of the Country Airplay chart, giving Ballard his third consecutive number one hit. The song has sold 195,000 copies in the US as of September 2015.

Music video
The music video was directed by Glen Rose and premiered in February 2015. It consists entirely of tour footage.

Charts

Year-end charts

References

2014 songs
2015 singles
Frankie Ballard songs
Warner Records singles
Songs written by Rhett Akins
Songs written by Ashley Gorley
Songs written by Shane McAnally
Song recordings produced by Marshall Altman